Gornot HaGalil (lit. Granaries of the Galilee) is a community settlement in northern Israel. Located near Ma'alot-Tarshiha, it falls under the jurisdiction of Ma'ale Yosef Regional Council.

History
The village was established in 1980 by members of families from local moshavim. Its name is derived from nearby Goren.

It was originally designed to be a municipal center, for that reason the municipal government offices and regional healthcare center are located there. In addition, many public facilities were planned to be constructed there, such as a sport center, elementary school and a community center. Despite these plans, for many years the village has been stale and none of the plans have been executed. Over the years the population started to diminished until there were only 40 families in the year 2014. Half of them were renting and not house owners.

In 2014, the Israeli Division of settlement started the execution of said plans due to a request from the academic settlement group "Beitenu Bagalil (Our house in the Galilee)" which asked to create an academic settlement in the Galilee. The local municipality gave blessing to this initiative in order to promote the village growth.

In 2016, the first communal extension began (out of total of 3 planned extensions), the new inhabitant of Gornot HaGalil were mostly young families (under the age of 40) and a very big part of them have academic degrees (including Medical Doctors, Phds, engineers and more). The total population of all 3 extensions is planned to be 400 families.

The children of Gornot HaGalil study in the regional high school "Galil Maaravi" which is a renowned school where students can study science and technology alongside arts and media.

References

Community settlements
Populated places established in 1980
Populated places in Northern District (Israel)
1980 establishments in Israel